Elizabeth Ann Nalley (also known as Ann Nalley)  is an American chemist and professor of chemistry at Cameron University in Lawton, Oklahoma.

Nalley was born in July, 1942 at Catron, Missouri. She received a B.S. in chemical education from Northeastern State University in Tahlequah, Oklahoma in 1965, an M.S. in analytical chemistry from Oklahoma State University in 1969, and a Ph.D. in radiation chemistry from Texas Woman's University in 1975. Her career as a chemistry instructor began before she finished her undergraduate education, with a stint as a chemistry teacher at Muskogee Central High School from 1964 to 1965. In 1969, she joined the Cameron University faculty as an instructor, and she has been a full professor (Cameron's first female full professor) since 1978.

Nalley has also served for 21 years on the board of directors of the honor society Phi Kappa Phi and was president from 1995 to 1998. In 2005, she was given the Iota Sigma Pi Award in Professional Excellence. She served as president of the American Chemical Society in 2006, and received the ACS Award for Encouraging Women into Careers in the Chemical Sciences in 2015.

References

External links
Nalley's web site  at Cameron University

Year of birth missing (living people)
Living people
People from Lawton, Oklahoma
Northeastern State University alumni
Oklahoma State University alumni
Cameron University faculty
Presidents of the American Chemical Society
American women chemists
21st-century American chemists
Texas Woman's University alumni
Chemists from Missouri
American women academics
21st-century American women scientists